Al-Barāʾ ibn ʿĀzib al-Anṣārī (died 690) was one of the companions of Muhammad and narrator of hadith.

Biography
He converted to Islam at a young age and fought beside Muhammad in fifteen battles, including the Battle of Khaybar, from which he reported hadith 
In 645, during the caliphate of Uthman, he was made governor of al-Ray (in Persia). He eventually retired to Kūfā and there he died in 690.

Significant events
He reported the hadith of hadith of the pond of Khumm and also figures in the transmission of numerous ḥadīth in the collections of Muslim and Bukhārī.
When Umar was at Fatimah's house, al-Bara was in it.

References

690 deaths
Year of birth unknown
Sahabah hadith narrators